Alejandro Pierola (born 20 November 1949) is a former professional tennis player from Chile.

Career
Pierola was a quarter-finalist in Grand Prix tournaments at Palermo in 1981 and Venice in 1982. He made two Grand Prix doubles semi-finals in 1981, at Bordeaux, with Guillermo Aubone and Palermo, with Pedro Rebolledo.

He competed in the French Open three times during his career and played in both the men's singles and men's doubles at each. At the 1978 French Open he had a win over Bernard Mitton, before losing in the second round to Manuel Orantes. He exited in the opening round of the singles in 1980 and 1982, with losses to José Luis Clerc and Pavel Složil.

Challenger titles

Singles: (1)

Doubles: (3)

References

1949 births
Living people
Chilean male tennis players
Tennis players from Santiago
20th-century Chilean people